WRVB (102.1 FM) is a radio station broadcasting a Top 40 (CHR) format. Licensed to Marietta, Ohio, United States, it serves the Parkersburg-Marietta area.  The station is currently owned by iHeartMedia, Inc. and features the bulk of its programming from iHeartMedia's Premium Choice "Hit Nation" format.

References

External links
 

RVB
Marietta, Ohio
Contemporary hit radio stations in the United States
IHeartMedia radio stations